More Radio Mid-Sussex, formerly Bright FM, is an Independent Local Radio station serving Burgess Hill, Haywards Heath, Lewes and surrounding areas. It is owned and operated by Total Sense Media and broadcasts from studios in Worthing, as part of a network of stations across Sussex.

Recent history
In 2005, Bright FM launched a second transmitter on 106.8 FM, extending its service to Lewes.

In April 2008, the station became part of Media Sound Holdings, following a merger with neighbouring radio station Worthing-based Splash FM. In June 2009, Media Sound Holdings added Arrow FM in Hastings and Sovereign FM in Eastbourne to their group from TLRC.

In November 2010, Ofcom approved a request to share programming across all four stations, stating the changes would not substantially alter the character of the service.

Programming
All programming on the station is produced from Total Sense's Worthing studios and shared with Arrow FM, Sovereign FM and Splash FM with opt-outs for local news and advertising.

Local news airs every hour from 6am to 6pm on weekdays and from 8am to 12pm on Saturdays with headlines on the half-hour during weekday breakfast and drivetime shows. National news bulletins from Sky News Radio are carried hourly at all other times.

References

External links
Official Website

Radio stations in Sussex
Lewes
Mid Sussex District
Burgess Hill